Andrew Waterman may refer to:

 Andrew Waterman (poet) (born 1940), British poet
 Andrew J. Waterman (1825–1900), lawyer and Attorney General of Massachusetts
 Andrew Kenneth Waterman (1913–1941), US Navy sailor